Hills Creek Dam is a dam about  southeast of Oakridge in Lane County, Oregon, United States.

Constructed in 1961 by the United States Army Corps of Engineers (USACE), the dam's purpose is primarily water storage and flood control, and secondarily for recreation, wildlife and waterfowl conservation, and hydropower generation. There are two hydropower-generating units capable of producing a total of 30 megawatts.

The dam is one of 13 USACE projects in the Willamette Valley, including two others further downstream on the Middle Fork Willamette, Lookout Point Lake and Dexter Reservoir.

See also
List of dams in the Columbia River watershed
Hills Creek

References

External links

Dams completed in 1961
Dams in Oregon
Lakes of Lane County, Oregon
United States Army Corps of Engineers dams
1961 establishments in Oregon